Ustaše genocide or Ustasha genocide may refer to:
Genocide of Serbs in the Independent State of Croatia
The Holocaust in the Independent State of Croatia
Genocide of Romani people in the Independent State of Croatia